At the 1976 Summer Olympics two archery events were contested.  It was the second iteration of the modern archery competition in the Olympics, following the same format as in the 1972 Summer Olympics.  The two events were men's individual and women's individual, and the competition in each event consisted of a double FITA round.  Archers shot a total of 288 arrows at 4 different distances (90, 70, 50, and 30 meters for men; 70, 60, 50, and 30 metres for women).

Medal summary
The United States repeated its sweep of the two gold medals.  Japan and Italy claimed their first archery medals in the men's competition.  The Soviet Union took the silver and bronze medals in the women's competition, adding to the bronze they had earned four years earlier.

Events

Medal table

Participating nations

References

External links
Official Olympic Report

 
1976 Summer Olympics events
1976
1976 in archery